Maria Kakiou (Μαρία Κακίου; born 29 January 1989 in Marousi) was a Greek group rhythmic gymnast. She represents her nation at international competitions. 

She participated at the 2004 Summer Olympics in the group all-around event finishing 5th in the final after finishing 4th in the qualification. 
She competed at world championships, including at the 2005 World Rhythmic Gymnastics Championships.

References

External links
Maria Kakiou at Sports Reference
https://database.fig-gymnastics.com/public/gymnasts/biography/2642/true?backUrl=%2Fpublic%2Fresults%2Fdisplay%2F14883%3FidAgeCategory%3D8%26idCategory%3D78%23anchor_84473
http://www.gymmedia.com/Baku05/nations_partic.pdf
https://web.archive.org/web/20160912150326/http://library.la84.org/6oic/OfficialReports/2004/Results/Gymnastics%20Rhythmic.pdf

1989 births
Living people
Greek rhythmic gymnasts
Gymnasts from Athens
Olympic gymnasts of Greece
Gymnasts at the 2004 Summer Olympics